Cayetana Fernández García-Poggio (born 2005) is a Spanish amateur golfer. In 2022, she won the World Junior Girls Championship and the Junior Golf World Cup.

Amateur career
Fernández was born in Madrid in 2005 and enjoyed an impressive amateur career, winning the European Girls' Team Championship, the Junior Vagliano Trophy and the Junior Solheim Cup in 2021.

In 2022, she won the Spanish International Ladies Amateur Championship, and was runner-up at the Girls Amateur Championship at Carnoustie Golf Links, behind Lottie Woad. She won the Junior Golf World Cup in Japan both with Spain and individually, and repeated the performance at the World Junior Girls Championship in Canada.

Fernández made two appearances on the 2022 Ladies European Tour, and tied for 3rd at the Madrid Ladies Open behind Ana Peláez and Linnea Ström. She led the LET season finale, the Andalucia Costa Del Sol Open De España, at the halfway point, ultimately finishing tied 5th, 3 strokes behind winner Caroline Hedwall.

Personal life 
Fernández has two sisters that are also accomplished golfers. Her older sister Blanca won the 2017 World Junior Girls Championship and played college golf with the Texas A&M Aggies women's golf team 2019–2023.

Amateur wins 
2019 Campeonato Norte Sub 25
2021 Copa Federacion Riojana de Golf, Campeonato de Espana Amateur III Memorial Emma Villacieros
2022 Spanish International Ladies Amateur Championship, Junior Golf World Cup (individual), World Junior Girls Championship (individual)

Source:

Team appearances
Amateur
Junior Vagliano Trophy (representing Europe): 2021 (winners)
Junior Solheim Cup (representing Europe): 2021 (winners)
European Girls' Team Championship (representing Spain): 2021 (winners), 2022
Espirito Santo Trophy (representing Spain): 2022
World Junior Girls Championship (representing Spain): 2022 (winners)
Junior Golf World Cup (representing Spain): 2022 (winners)

References

External links

Spanish female golfers
Amateur golfers
Golfers from Madrid
2005 births
Living people
21st-century Spanish women